The MegaMix is Lil Suzy's first compilation album launched on 30 November 1999 by the Metropolitan Recording Corporation. Includes several mixes of her hits as well as re-recorded songs in a non-stop mix.

The song "You're the Only One" was released as a single to promote the album. On 5 October 2000, the album was released in Germany under the name of Best of ... (Non-stop Mixed) and was released the same year with an identical track listing.

Track listing
 "You're the Only One" (2:50)
 "Promise Me" (2:17)
 "Just Can't Get Over You" (2:40)
 "The Way I Love You" (2:30)
 "Now & Forever" (3:29)
 "Memories" (3:33)
 "Take Me Back" (2:58)
 "I Still Love You" (4:10)
 "Everytime I Dream" (2:50)
 "When I Fall In Love" (4:19)
 "Do You Want to Ride" (3:04)
 "Can't Get You Out of My Mind" (2:56)
 "I Want Your Love" (2:15)
 "Lies" (2:57)
 "The Nite" (3:37)
 "Take Me In Your Arms (2000)" (4:07)
 "You're the Only One" (4:04)
 "Till the End of Time (Remake)" (4:15)
 "Real Love (Remake)" (3:31)

References

Lil Suzy albums
1999 compilation albums